John Edwin Hall (born 5 January 1950) is an English former first-class cricketer.

Hall was born at Maseru in British Basutoland. He later attended the University of Cambridge in England. While studying at Cambridge, he made his debut in first-class cricket for Cambridge University against Nottinghamshire at Fenner's in 1969. He played first-class cricket for Cambridge until 1970, making a further thirteen appearances. He scored 385 runs at an average of 14.80, with a high score of 69. In addition to playing first-class cricket, Hall also played minor counties cricket for Suffolk between 1969–71, making 27 appearances in the Minor Counties Championship.

References

External links

1950 births
Living people
People from Maseru
Alumni of the University of Cambridge
English cricketers
Suffolk cricketers
Cambridge University cricketers